Halunda Tavaru is a 1994 Indian Kannada-language drama film starring Vishnuvardhan and Sithara. It was directed by D. Rajendra Babu and produced by Vizag Raju. The music and lyrics were written and composed by Hamsalekha. It was commercially successful and completed 25 weeks in many theaters. It is based on a novel of the same name by Krishnamoorthy Puranik.

Plot
The story revolves around a couple who are brought up in contrasting financial situations and how they undergo the riches to rags transition in life. The film was tagged as a tragedy drama with the lead protagonists passing away towards the climax.

Cast

 Vishnuvardhan 
 Sithara
 Pandari Bai
 Srinivasa Murthy
 Krishne Gowda
 Pramila Joshai
 Gayathri Prabhakar
 Sanketh Kashi

Soundtrack
 "Elu Shiva" - K. S. Chitra
 "Ele Hombisile" - K. S. Chitra, S. P. Balasubrahmanyam
 "Olavina Runava" - K. S. Chitra, S. P. Balasubrahmanyam
 "Ee Dharege" - K. S. Chitra, S. P. Balasubrahmanyam
 "Thaayi Illadante" - Mano
 "Haalunda Tavarannu" - S. Janaki

Awards
 Karnataka State Film Award for Best Music Director - Hamsalekha
 Filmfare Award for Best Music Director - Hamsalekha
 Filmfare Award for Best Actor - Vishnuvardhan

References

External links
 Official website on VishnuVardhan
 Apunkachoice.com

1994 films
1990s Kannada-language films
Films scored by Hamsalekha
Films based on Indian novels
Films directed by D. Rajendra Babu